Arthur George Hooper (30 January 1857 – 28 April 1940) was a British Liberal Party politician.

Background
Hooper was a son of George Freeman Hooper and Sarah Pitt. He married Fanny Shillito of Birmingham. He was a Congregationalist. He played cricket for Dudley Cricket Club from 1888 to 1892.

Career
He first was a partner in the firm of Dudley-based solicitors, Hooper & Fairbairn, then serving on Dudley Town Council. He sat as Liberal MP for Dudley from 1906 to 1910. He first stood for parliament at the 1906 General Election when he gained Dudley from the Conservatives.

When he stood for re-election at the January 1910 General Election, he held his seat. However, at the December 1910 General Election, he was defeated by the Conservatives.

External links
Photograph at the National Portrait Gallery; http://www.npg.org.uk/collections/search/portraitLarge/mw119162/Arthur-George-Hooper?LinkID=mp85097&search=sas&sText=Arthur+George+Hooper&role=sit&rNo=0
Who Was Who; http://www.ukwhoswho.com
His Papers at The National Archives; http://www.nationalarchives.gov.uk/a2a/records.aspx?cat=145-8894&cid=-1#-1

Sources
Who Was Who
British parliamentary election results 1885–1918, Craig, F. W. S.
Black Country History; http://blackcountryhistory.org

References

1857 births
1940 deaths
UK MPs 1906–1910
Liberal Party (UK) MPs for English constituencies
People from Birmingham, West Midlands
English Congregationalists
People from Dudley